Authoritarian literature  is a term used by John Gardner to designate the body of literature written by persons living under an authoritarian governmental regime. Literary works produced in these regimes share common characteristics that make the designation useful. Authoritarian regimes revere their leaders, who historically were typically referred to as kings, along with advisors to the king. These leaders were considered innately better than ordinary people. The authoritarian leader, and his approved circle, if not directly writing about a subject themselves, were the only ones who could designate, approve, and sanction writers as acceptable authorities. Government authorities also financially supported writers under a patronage system. The writers in such a system therefore must necessarily be careful to ensure the composition of their work met (or would meet) the approval of authorities. Failure to comply risked official warnings, loss of governmental sanction, and sometimes even imprisonment or loss of life.

Fiction produced under authoritarian regimes tends to be didactic. Subject matter can vary in terms of plot, but the didactic point of the work is almost always to illustrate what authorities would consider the proper comportment of individuals within the authoritarian society. This didactic point is conveyed to readers in order to idealize the existing social structure and thus, hopefully, perpetuate it. Authoritarian fiction is considered to be demonstrative in purpose rather than explorative. The author's narrative voice is also usually authoritarian in order to impart something known by the author that is presumably not known by the reader. Since most people don't enjoy and resist being spoken to as an inferior, the more successful (or popular) authors of such literature are the ones who best disguise, or sugarcoat, their didactic purpose. One common way to achieve such indirectness is through the use of the form allegory.

Examples

Good examples of authoritarian literature include Beowulf, Pilgrim's Progress, and in English literature we see vestiges as late as Charles Dickens. While didacticism forms a significant component of Shaw's, Orwell's and C. S. Lewis' fiction as well, their works can not strictly be considered as authoritarian literature because they were not writing at the whim of political leaders. Dickens was not writing for the British government either, but he used the same forms of his predecessors, who did write for the court, particularly in his earlier novels, such as A Tale of Two Cities and David Copperfield, where we most easily observe a certain preachiness. Dickens constructed his plots for the sake of demonstration rather than the purpose of exploration. However, Charles Dickens is a transitional figure, and in his later novels, such as Great Expectations, we can "feel the two impulses warring in the writer's mind".

Contemporary Works

Authoritarian literature is, of course, not a purely historical phenomenon. It persists as the dominant form of everyday literature of Middle Eastern countries (Turkey, Israel, Lebanon, and arguably Palestine and Iran's literature excepted), and, until recently, Chinese literature. To understand the nature of authoritarian literature's purpose is to better understand the reason for the forms in which we see literature currently being produced in these countries.

The antithesis to Authoritarian literature is Anti-Authoritarian literature. Practitioners of this genre in the aforementioned countries are routinely subjected to harsh sanctions, and many choose to go into exile in order to write freely. Still other writers suffer censorship and imprisonment at their government's hands (e.g. Sunallah Ibrahim and Abdul Rahman Munif). Authoritarian literature authors, however, who write works of fiction that support or praise governments, as expected, often see promotion to positions of authority within their respective country's governing cultural body

Notes and references

Fiction
Narratology
Fiction by genre
Literature about literature